Howard L. Wright (born February 22, 1947, in Louisville, Kentucky) is a retired professional basketball shooting guard who played two seasons in the American Basketball Association (ABA) as member of the Kentucky Colonels (1970–72). He attended Austin Peay State University where he was selected during the second round of the 1970 NBA draft, but never signed.

External links

1947 births
Living people
American men's basketball players
Austin Peay Governors men's basketball players
Basketball players from Louisville, Kentucky
Kentucky Colonels players
New York Knicks draft picks
Shooting guards